Dřešín is a municipality and village in Strakonice District in the South Bohemian Region of the Czech Republic. It has about 300 inhabitants.

Administrative parts
Villages of Chvalšovice, Dřešínek and Hořejšice are administrative parts of Dřešín.

References

Villages in Strakonice District